Vairengte is a town in the Kolasib district of Mizoram state, India.

Administration

Vairengte is a sub-divisional headquarters. The main officers within Vairengte are:

 Sub-Divisional Officer (Civil) or SDO (C)
 Sub-Divisional Police Officer (SDPO)
 Sub-Divisional Officer (SDO), PWD, Highway Sub-Division
 Sub-Divisional Officer (SDO), P&E, Power Sub-Division
 Agriculture Extension Officer (AEO)
 Range Officer (RO), Environment & Forest Dept.

Demographics

As of the 2011 Census of India, The total population in Vairengte town is 10,554. There are 5,649 males; There are 4,905 females.

Population of Children with age of 0-6 is 1441 which is 13.65 % of total population of Vairengte. Female Sex Ratio is of 868, which is lower than the Mizoram's state average 976. Moreover Child Sex Ratio is around 1013, which is higher than the state average of 970. Literacy rate of Vairengte city is 94.73 % higher than state average of 91.33 %. Male literacy is around 95.24 % while female literacy rate is 94.14 %. 

There are 1,931 House Holds in Vairengte.

Religion
 census, there are 83.51% Christians, 10.44% Hindus, 5.44% Muslims and 0.61% others including Buddhist and Sikhs.

Bank
 State Bank of India 
 UCO Bank
 Mizoram Rural Bank
 Bandhan Bank

Media
The Major Newspaper in Vairengte are Vairengte Aw:  and Rengkhawpui.

CIJWS

The original plans to set up a counter-insurgency unit to train soldiers came about following the government response to the Mizo militancy in the 1960s. Field Marshal Sam Manekshaw, then the General Officer Commanding-in-Chief (GOC-IN-C) of the Indian Army's Eastern Command, was the first proponent for the institute.

CIJWS was established in 1967 as the Jungle Training School. It was initially located in Mynkre, near Jowal in Jaintia Hills district of Meghalaya. In 1968, the designation was changed to Eastern Command Counter Insurgency Training School. On 1 May 1970, it was upgraded to a Category A Training Establishment of the Indian Army, given its current name and relocated to Vairengte. Brigadier Mathew Thomas was appointed the school's first Commandant.

The crisis in neighbouring East Pakistan and the resulting liberation struggle for Bangladesh prompted a temporary refocus as the Mukti Bahini guerrillas were trained at the institute. Operation Jackpot undertaken by the Mukti Bahini rebels was an instance of the school's training success. Since the Indo-Pakistani War of 1971, CIJWS has focused to its primary role of counter-insurgency training.

CIJWS has hosted visiting military units for training from the United States, Singapore, Nepal, Bhutan, Russia, United Kingdom, Israel, France, Bangladesh and many other nations.

The success of this school prompted the establishment of another counter-insurgency training centre, the Kaziranga Special Jungle Warfare Training School in Assam.

Education
 Vairengte Higher Secondary School
 Government Vairengte High School
 Vairengte High School-II Ph- 03837 261 406.
 St Henry School
 Vairengte New Secondary School
 Army School Vairengte
 Government Middle School I
 Government Middle School II
 Government Middle School III
 Upper Primary school, Stateveng
 Upper Primary school, IOC veng
 Presbyterian English School
 ZD English School
 Government Primary School I
 Government Primary School II
 Government Primary School III
 Government Primary School V
 Government Primary School VI
 Government Primary School VII
 Baptist English School
 Counterinsurgency and Jungle Warfare School (CIJWS) is a training and research establishment of the Indian Army specialising in unconventional warfare, especially counter-insurgency and guerrilla warfare. CIJW is one of the premier counter-insurgency training institutions in the world.

Neighbourhoods
 Silchar
 Saihapui V
 Phainuam
 N.Chhimluang
 Bhaga Bazar
 Channighat
 Lailapur

Connectivity
Vairengte is connected by road, railways and air to the rest of the country.
Vairengte is connected by NH 306. The nearest Rail Station is Silchar Rail Station and it is 47.7 km far from Vairengte. The Nearest Airport is Silchar Airport, it is 71.8 km from Vairengte. The Nearest State Capital is Aizawl, a capital of Mizoram, it is 124 km far away from Vairengte.

See also
 Tourism in North East India

References

Kolasib
Cities and towns in Kolasib district